Holden Madagame (born 1990) is an American transgender tenor.

Career 
Madagame attended the University of Michigan School of Music, Theatre & Dance. While still a mezzo-soprano, he studied under bass-baritone Stephen West.

In 2017, Madagame participated in the Glyndebourne Academy. He has worked for companies including Passaggio Oper, Fulham Opera, Gerhart Hauptmann Theater in Görlitz, and the Brandenburgisches Konzertorchester. 

In 2019, he collaborated on Good Country, an opera about the life of transgender stagecoach driver Charley Parkhurst.

Other work

Film and television 
Madagame provided voice-over work for the 2016 film The Florence Foster Jenkins Story.

Activism 
Madagame identifies as a trans activist. On his YouTube channel, he has videos about various transgender topics. When participating in the  2021 "Circle of Resilience" concert for Intermountain Opera Bozeman in Bozeman, Montana, Madagame made a video educating the audience about Two-spirit people.

Personal life 

Madagame is a non-binary and trans person and identifies as queer. He began hormone replacement therapy in 2015. He is also an Odawa Native American.

As of 2021, he resides in Berlin, Germany.

See also 

 Glyndebourne Festival Opera
American Indian opera

References

External links 
 Official website
 YouTube channel

1990 births
Living people
American operatic tenors
American LGBT singers
21st-century American opera singers
LGBT classical musicians
21st-century American male singers
21st-century American singers
University of Michigan School of Music, Theatre & Dance alumni
American transgender people
Transgender male musicians
Odawa people
Transgender singers